Percival Everett (born December 22, 1956) is an American writer and Distinguished Professor of English at the University of Southern California.

Life
Everett lives in Los Angeles, California.

Literary career
While completing his AM degree at Brown University, Everett wrote his first novel, Suder (1983), about Craig Suder, a Seattle Mariners third baseman in a major league slump, both on and off the field.  Everett's second novel, Walk Me to the Distance (1985), features veteran David Larson after his return from Vietnam. Larson becomes involved in a search for the developmentally disabled son of a sheep rancher in Slut's Whole, Wyoming. The novel was later adapted with an altered plot as an ABC-TV movie entitled Follow Your Heart.

Cutting Lisa (1986; re-issued 2000) begins with John Livesey meeting a man who has performed a Caesarean section. This prompts the protagonist to evaluate his relationships.

In 1987, Everett published The Weather and Women Treat Me Fair: Stories, a collection of short stories. In 1990, Everett published two books re-fashioning Greek myths: Zulus, which combines the grotesque and the apocalypse; and For Her Dark Skin, a new version of Medea by the Greek playwright Euripides.

Switching genres, Everett next wrote a children's book, The One That Got Away (1992), an illustrated book for young readers that follows three cowboys as they attempt to corral "ones", the mischievous numerals.

Returning to novels, Everett published his first book-length western, God's Country, in 1994. In this novel, Curt Marder and his tracker Bubba search "God's country" for Marder's wife, who has been kidnapped by bandits. Marder is not sure whether he wants to find her. The book is a parody of westerns and the politics of race and gender, which includes a cross-dressing George Armstrong Custer.

In 1996, Everett published two books: Watershed has a contemporary western setting, in which the loner hydrologist Robert Hawkes meets a Native American "small person", who helps him come to terms with the inter-relation of people. That year, Everett also published his second collection of stories, Big Picture.

In Frenzy (1997), Everett returned to Greek mythology. Vlepo, Dionysos' assistant, is forced to experience a "frenzy" of odd activities, including becoming lice and bedroom curtains at different times during the story, which he narrates. This occurs so he can explain what the experiences are like to Dionysos, the half-god.

Glyph (1999) is the story within a story of Ralph, a baby who chooses not to speak but has extraordinary muscle-control and an IQ nearing 500, which he uses to write notes to his mother on a variety of literary topics based on books she supplies. Ralph is kidnapped a variety of times due to his special skills, and his odyssey (as "written" by four-year-old Ralph) teaches him more about love than intellect.

Grand Canyon, Inc. (2001) is Everett's first novella. In it, Rhino Tanner attempts to tame Mother Nature with a commercialization of the Grand Canyon.

Everett also published in 2001 the novel Erasure, in which he portrays how the publishing industry pigeon-holes African-American writers. The novel, a metafictional piece, satirically revolves around a novella written by the main character entitled My Pafology then Fuck, which emulates fiction such as Richard Wright's Native Son and Sapphire's novel Push.

A History of the African-American People (proposed) by Strom Thurmond, as told to Percival Everett and James Kincaid (2004) is an epistolary novel that chronicles the characters Percival Everett and James Kincaid as they work with Thurmond (occasionally) and his aide's crazy assistant, Barton Wilkes. The latter orders the authors around even as he stalks them.

Also in 2004, Everett released American Desert and Damned If I Do: Stories, another collection of short stories. In American Desert, Ted Street plans to drown himself in the ocean but is killed in a traffic accident on the way there. Three days later, Street suddenly sits up in his casket at the funeral, although his head is severed and he lacks a beating heart. Throughout the rest of the novel, Street undergoes an odyssey of self-discovery about what being alive really means, exploring religion, revelation, faith, zealotry, love, family, media sensationalism, and death.

Wounded: A Novel (2005) tells the story of John Hunt, a horse trainer confronted with hate crimes against a homosexual and a Native American. Hunt avoids getting mixed up in the political nature of these crimes, taking action only when he is forced to do so.

Everett's 2006 collection of poetry, re:f (gesture), features one of his paintings on the front cover. His latest poetry book, Swimming Swimmers Swimming, was published in 2010 by Red Hen Press.

The Water Cure (2007) is a novel about Ishmael Kidder, who has had a successful career as a romance novelist until the death of his daughter, when his life takes a dark turn. In a remote cabin in New Mexico, Kidder has imprisoned a man he believes to be his daughter's killer. The book's title refers to one of the torture techniques Kidder uses on the man, namely waterboarding.

In 2009, Graywolf Press released I Am Not Sidney Poitier. The protagonist, with the name Not Sidney Poitier and a resemblance to the actor with a similar name, meets challenges relating to identity and racial segregation across North America. He faces similar challenges with identity construction in relation to his adopted father, Ted Turner.

Assumption: A Novel (2011) is a triptych of stories with some characters who have been in earlier Everett stories. "Big" returns to the character of Ogden Walker, deputy sheriff of a small New Mexico town. He is on the trail of an old woman's murderer. But at the crime scene, his are the only footprints leading up to and away from her door. Something is amiss, and even his mother knows it. As other cases pile up, Ogden gives chase, pursuing flimsy leads for even flimsier reasons. His hunt leads him from the seamier side of Denver to a hippie commune as he seeks the puzzling solution.

In February 2013, Graywolf Press published Percival Everett by Virgil Russell.

In 2021, Graywolf Press published The Trees, a novel about lynching in Mississippi (published in the UK by Influx Press). It won the Anisfield-Wolf Book Award and was shortlisted for the 2022 Booker Prize.

Dr. No, published by Graywolf Press in 2022, was named a finalist for the 2023 National Book Critics award for fiction.

Bibliography

Novels
Suder (Viking Books, 1983)
Walk Me to the Distance (Clarion Books, 1985)
Cutting Lisa (Ticknor & Fields, 1986)
Zulus (The Permanent Press, 1990)
For Her Dark Skin (Owl Creek Press, 1990)
God's Country (Faber & Faber, 1994)
Watershed (Graywolf Press, 1996)
The Body of Martin Aguilera (Owl Creek Press, 1997)
Frenzy (Graywolf Press, 1997)
Glyph (Graywolf Press, 1999)
Grand Canyon, Inc. (Versus Press, 2001)
Erasure (University Press of New England, 2001)
A History of the African-American people (proposed) by Strom Thurmond, as told to Percival Everett and James Kincaid (with James Kincaid) (Akashic Books, 2004)
American Desert (Hyperion Books, 2004)
Wounded (Graywolf Press, 2005)
The Water Cure (Graywolf Press, 2007)
I Am Not Sidney Poitier: A Novel (Graywolf Press, 2009)
Assumption (Graywolf Press, 2011)
Percival Everett by Virgil Russell: A Novel (Graywolf Press, 2013)
So Much Blue (Graywolf Press, 2017)
Telephone (Graywolf Press, 2020)
The Trees (Graywolf Press, 2021; UK: Influx Press)
Dr. No (Graywolf Press, 2022)

Short stories
The Weather and Women Treat Me Fair: Stories (August House Publishers, Inc., 1987)
Big Picture: Stories (Graywolf Press, 1996)
Damned if I do: Stories (Graywolf Press, 2004)
Half an Inch of Water (Graywolf Press, 2015)

Poetry
re:f (gesture) (Red Hen Press, 2006), a collection of poetry
Abstraktion und Einfühlung (with Chris Abani) (Akashic Books, 2008), a collection of poetry
Swimming Swimmers Swimming (Red Hen Press, 2010), a collection of poetry
There Are No Names for Red (a collaboration with Chris Abani; paintings by Percival Everett) (Red Hen Press, 2010), a collection of poetry
Trout's Lie (Red Hen Press, 2015), a collection of poetry
The Book of Training by Colonel Hap Thompson of Roanoke, VA, 1843: Annotated From the Library of John C. Calhoun (Red Hen Press, 2019)

Children's literature
The One That Got Away (with Dirk Zimmer) (Clarion Books, 1992), a children's book

Contributions
 My California: Journeys by Great Writers (Angel City Press, 2004)
 Everett's introduction was added to the 2004 paperback edition of The Jefferson Bible.

As guest editor
 Ploughshares, Fall 2014 (vol. 40, nos 2 & 3)

Awards and honors 
 Academy Award in Literature from The American Academy of Arts and Letters
 Hurston/Wright Legacy Award for Fiction (Erasure and I Am Not Sidney Poitier: A Novel)
 New American Writing Award
 Everett's stories have been included in the Pushcart Prize Anthology and Best American Short Stories
 2006: PEN Center USA Award for Fiction for Wounded
 2008: Received an honorary doctorate from the College of Santa Fe
 2010: Winner of the Believer Book Award for I Am Not Sidney Poitier
 2010: Winner of the 29th Dos Passos Prize 
 2010: Winner of the Premio Gregor von Rezzori for foreign fiction translated into Italian for Wounded (Ferito), translated by Marco Rossari
 2015: Awarded Guggenheim Fellowship in Fiction
 2015: Awarded Phi Kappa Phi Presidential Medallion from the University of Southern California
 2016: Creative Capital Award
 2018: PEN Oakland/Josephine Miles Literary Award for So Much Blue
 2021: Finalist for the Pulitzer Prize for fiction for Telephone
 2022: Shortlisted for the Booker Prize for The Trees
 2022: Winner of the Bollinger Everyman Wodehouse Prize for Comic Fiction for The Trees

Further reading
 Derek C. Maus, Jesting in Earnest: Percival Everett and Menippean Satire (University of South Carolina Press; 2019)
 Anthony Stewart, Approximate Gestures: Infinite Spaces in the Fiction of Percival Everett (Louisiana State University Press; 2020)
 Barbara Miceli, "Della triste impermanenza di ogni cosa: recensione di Telefono di Percival Everett" in L ïndice dei Libri del mese (December 2022)

References

External links

Blue Flower Arts one of Everett's official websites
IdentityTheory.com interview with Everett (2003)
A USC Article about Everett
Everett's USC Homepage.
"Object and Word" by Everett
topolivres video interview with Everett (2008)
Percival Everett by Rone Shavers Bomb
Percival Everett on the myth of race. Video interview, Austin Community College Arts & Humanities, 2 March 2011.()

Living people
1956 births
20th-century African-American writers
20th-century American male writers
20th-century American non-fiction writers
20th-century American novelists
20th-century American short story writers
21st-century African-American writers
21st-century American male writers
21st-century American non-fiction writers
21st-century American novelists
21st-century American short story writers
African-American novelists
American academics of English literature
American male non-fiction writers
American male novelists
American male short story writers
Believer Book Award winners
Brown University alumni
Novelists from Georgia (U.S. state)
Novelists from South Carolina
PEN Oakland/Josephine Miles Literary Award winners
PEN/Faulkner Award for Fiction winners
University of Southern California faculty
Writers from California